George Edward Ford (1889 – after 1916) was an English amateur footballer who played in the Football League for Woolwich Arsenal as a left back.

Personal life 
Ford served as a sergeant with the Football Battalion of the Middlesex Regiment during the First World War and was wounded in the left arm whilst attacking The Quadrilateral on the opening day of the Battle of the Ancre in November 1916. The injury led to his discharge from the army in October 1917 and his retirement from football.

Career statistics

References

1889 births
Year of death missing
Footballers from Woolwich
English footballers
Association football fullbacks
Gravesend United F.C. players
Dartford F.C. players
Arsenal F.C. players
English Football League players
British Army personnel of World War I
Middlesex Regiment soldiers
Date of birth unknown
Date of death unknown
British shooting survivors
Military personnel from London